Emily Jazmin Tatum Perez (19 February 1983 – 12 September 2006) was a Second Lieutenant in the United States Army serving in Iraq. She was the first female graduate of West Point to die in Iraq.

Early life and education
Born in Heidelberg, West Germany, of African American and Hispanic parents in a U.S. military family, she graduated from Oxon Hill High School in Maryland, where she ranked among the top-10 students in her class. In July 2001, after graduation from high school, Perez entered the United States Military Academy at West Point. There she was an exemplary student and talented track athlete, becoming the highest-ranking African-American female cadet in the history of West Point. She was a Cadet Command Sergeant Major.

Career and death
 
Following graduation from West Point in 2005, she was commissioned a Second Lieutenant in the 204th Support Battalion, 2nd Brigade, 4th Infantry Division of the United States Army.

Perez was deployed to Iraq in December as a Medical Service Corps officer. She was killed when a makeshift bomb exploded near her Humvee during combat operations in Al Kifl, near Najaf. 

Lieutenant Perez's military awards include the Bronze Star, Purple Heart, Army Commendation Medal, National Defense Service Medal, Iraq Campaign Medal, Global War on Terrorism Service Medal, Army Service Ribbon, Overseas Service Ribbon, and the Combat Action Badge. She posthumously received the NCAA Award of Valor in 2008.

Emily Perez was the 64th female member of the U.S. military to be killed in Iraq or Afghanistan and the 40th West Point graduate killed since the September 11, 2001 attacks. 

She was the first female graduate of West Point to die in Iraq.

Perez was buried at the West Point Cemetery.

References

External links

 Partlow, Joshua and Lonnae O'Neal Parker, "West Point Mourns a Font Of Energy, Laid to Rest by War", The Washington Post, 27 September 2006
Faces of the Fallen: 2nd Lt. Emily J. Perez, The Washington Post
West Point Graduate Is First of 'Class of 9/11' to Die in Combat, Reuters via Los Angeles Times, 27 September 2006
Death Comes Calling For the Class of 9/11, Time, 1 October 2006
Memorial program (PowerPoint), medicalservicecorps.amedd.army.mil]

1983 births
2006 deaths
African-American female military personnel
American military personnel killed in the Iraq War
Burials at West Point Cemetery
United States Military Academy alumni
Women in the Iraq War
Women in the United States Army
United States Army personnel of the Iraq War
21st-century American women
African-American United States Army personnel